The German locomotives Comet, Faust, Blitz and Windsbraut were four of the first locomotives on the Leipzig–Dresden Railway Company (LDE). They were four-coupled engines, that Rothwell and Company had built in Manchester between 1835 and 1838.

Comet was the first locomotive to be delivered to Saxony.  She arrived at Leipzig in November 1836, packed in 15 crates. After her reassembly testing began on 28 March 1837 and she was then deployed on railway construction duties. She was followed by Blitz, Windsbraut and Faust, the last named being similar in dimensions to Comet. The other two were somewhat larger (their technical data, where different, are given in the table after a "/")

All the engines had a cylindrical firebox and boiler barrel, an oak locomotive frame reinforced with sheet iron and inside cylinders and valve gear. In 1842, following a serious accident in France the operation of twin-axled locomotives was banned and the engines were given 0-4-2 wheel arrangement through the addition of a trailing axle. Such early machines often had to be repaired at frequent intervals and these engines were no exception. Windsbraut blew up on 21 May 1846 in charge of a train that was ready to depart from the Dresdner station in Leipzig. The other locomotives were retired no later than 1849.

See also 
 Royal Saxon State Railways
 List of Saxon locomotives and railbuses
 Leipzig–Dresden Railway Company

Sources 
 This article was created from a translation of the equivalent German language article

Early steam locomotives
0-4-0 locomotives
0-4-2 locomotives
Locomotives of Saxony
Railway locomotives introduced in 1835
Passenger locomotives